Wangjing may refer to several places:

China
Wangjing, Beijing (望京), a major residential, technological and business area in Beijing
Wangjing SOHO, a tower complex in Beijing
Wangjing, Tang County (王京镇), town in Tang County, Baoding, Hebei Province

Metro stations
Wangjing station
Wangjingxi station (Wangjing West station)
Wangjingdong station (Wangjing East station)
Wangjingnan station (Wangjing South station)

India
Wangjing, Manipur, town and a nagar panchayat in Manipur

See also
Wangjin, traditional Chinese headware